Cacumen is the first full-length album by the heavy metal band Cacumen. It was released in 1981 on the independent label Rockport Records.  The album came out after their single, Riding Away, was released two years prior and features a new version of that song. Cacumen would rename themselves Bonfire in 1986. In 2002/2003, Claus Lessmann and Hans Ziller purchased the rights to the Cacumen material and re-release the collection under the Bonfire name individually as well as a box set called The Early Days.

Track listing

Band members
Claus Lessmann – lead vocals
Hans Ziller – lead & rhythm guitar
Horst Maier – lead & rhythm guitar
Hans Hauptmann – bass
Hans Forstner – drums

References
 Billboard.com - Discography - Cacumen - Cacumen

Bonfire (band) albums
1981 debut albums